Hasanlar can refer to:

 Həsənlər
 Hasanlar Dam
 Hasanlar, Bartın
 Hasanlar, Çine
 Hasanlar, Dursunbey
 Hasanlar, Düzce
 Hasanlar, Gerede
 Hasanlar, Göynük